Check Your Head is the third studio album by American rap rock group Beastie Boys, released by Grand Royal and Capitol Records on April 21, 1992. Three years elapsed between the releases of the band's second studio album Paul's Boutique and Check Your Head, which was recorded at the G-Son Studios in Atwater Village in 1991 under the guidance of producer Mario Caldato Jr., the group's third producer in as many albums.  Less sample-heavy than their previous records, the album features instrumental contributions from all three members: Adam Horovitz on guitar, Adam Yauch on bass guitar, and Mike Diamond on drums.

The album was re-released in a number of formats in 2009, with 16 b-sides and rarities, as well as a commentary track, included as bonus material. It is one of the albums profiled in the 2007 book Check the Technique, which includes a track-by-track breakdown by Diamond, Yauch, Horovitz, Caldato, and frequent Beasties collaborator Money Mark.

Background 
Check Your Head was the first Beastie Boys album to be fully co-produced by Mario Caldato Jr., who had been an engineer on Paul's Boutique and was credited as producer on that album's track "Ask for Janice". It also marked the first appearance on one of their albums of keyboardist Money Mark, who became a regular collaborator of the band.

The album was somewhat of a return by the Beastie Boys to their punk roots. It featured the trio playing their own instruments on the majority of the album, for the first time on record since their early EPs, due to the commercial failure of Paul's Boutique. This inspired photographer Glen E. Friedman to shoot photos of the Beasties with their instrument cases, one of which was used as the cover of the album. Supposedly, a trading card for Norman Schwarzkopf, Jr. from a set of Desert Storm trading cards was the inspiration for the album's title.

The Beastie Boys toured with the Rollins Band and Cypress Hill in early 1992 to support Check Your Head.

Critical reception 

Check Your Head has received widespread acclaim since its release. Kevin Powell of Rolling Stone called Check Your Head the Beastie Boys' "most unconventional outing to date" and stated that "the cross-pollination of styles on Check Your Head is confusing at times, yet the album achieves distinction because of its ingenuity." Greg Kot of the Chicago Tribune wrote that the group were showing "surprising resiliency and versatility", noting their new musical direction on Check Your Head and singling out Money Mark's performance on the album for praise, referring to him as the album's "secret weapon". Entertainment Weeklys David Browne, on the other hand, panned the album as a "muddled, clanking mess". Robert Christgau of The Village Voice called Check Your Head a "great concept", but felt "the execution is halfway there at best", later assigning it a "neither" rating, indicating an album that "may impress once or twice with consistent craft or an arresting track or two. Then it won't."

Spin ranked Check Your Head at number four on their list of the 20 best albums of the year, and it ranked in fifth place on The Village Voices year-end Pazz & Jop critics' poll. Spin later ranked the album number 12 on their list of the 90 greatest albums of the 1990s, while Alternative Press ranked it at number 23 on their list of the top 99 albums released from 1985–95. Pitchfork ranked the album at number 67 on their Top 150 Albums of the 1990s list in 2022, praising the album's funk-inspired instrumentals. In a retrospective review, Stephen Thomas Erlewine of AllMusic called Check Your Head "a whirlwind tour through the Beasties' pop-culture obsessions, but instead of spinning into Technicolor fantasies, it's earth-bound D.I.Y. that makes it all seem equally accessible — which is a big reason why it turned out to be an alt-rock touchstone of the '90s, something that both set trends and predicted them." It was ranked number 261 in the 2020 edition of Rolling Stones 500 Greatest Albums of All-Time list (though it was not ranked in the original 2003 list or the 2012 revision).

Track listing 
All tracks written by Beastie Boys (Adam Yauch, Michael Diamond, Adam Horovitz) and "Money" Mark Nishita, except where noted.

Personnel 
Beastie Boys
Ad-Rock – vocals, guitar
MCA – vocals, bass
Mike D – vocals, drums

Additional personnel
Money Mark – organ, synthesizer, keyboards, clavinet, Wurlitzer
James Bradley, Jr. (Tracks 2, 4, 10, 13, 16, 20) – percussion
Juanito Vazquez (Tracks 5, 15) – percussion (cuica, conga)
Art Oliva (Tracks 5, 19) – percussion (batá, shakeree)
Drew Lawrence (Track 6) – percussion (tamboura, mridunga)
Marcel Hall – vocals on "The Biz Vs. The Nuge"
Alexandra "Xan" Cassavetes (credited as "Nax Setevassac") – background vocals on "The Maestro"

Technical personnel
Beastie Boys – producer
Mario Caldato, Jr. – producer, engineer
Tom Baker – mastering
Glen E. Friedman – photography

Charts

Certifications

References

External links 
 

1992 albums
Beastie Boys albums
Capitol Records albums
Albums produced by Mario Caldato Jr.
Rapcore albums
Alternative rock albums by American artists